Happel is a surname of German origin. Notable people with the surname include:

Carl Happel (1819-1914), German painter
Eberhard Werner Happel (1647–1690), German author, novelist, journalist and polymath
Ernst Happel (1925–1992), Austrian football player and coach
Otto Happel (born 1948), German billionaire businessman
Fred Happel Born 1970 Councilor at Large Weymouth Ma USA

References